Magnisudis is a genus of barracudinas.

Species
There are currently three recognized species in this genus:
 Magnisudis atlantica (Krøyer, 1868) (Duckbill barracudina)
 Magnisudis indica (Ege, 1953)
 Magnisudis prionosa (Rofen, 1963) (Southern barracudina)

References

Paralepididae
Marine fish genera